µF may refer to:
Microfarad
Microformat